Sólo una Mujer ("Just a Woman") is the 9th album by Mexican singer Lucía Méndez. It was released in 1984 as she was filming the telenovela Tú o Nadie. This album received a nomination for a Grammy Award for Best Latin Pop Album.

Track listing
 "Sólo una Mujer" 
 "La Luna de Cancún" 
 "Ella es una Señora" 
 "El Amor sin Ti no Vale Nada" 
 "Padre Nuestro" 
 "Romántica" 
 "Puede Ser, Puede Ser" 
 "Don corazón"  
 "Corazón de Piedra" 
 "Soy Bellísima"

Singles
 Corazón de Piedra / Don corazón
 Sólo una Mujer / La Luna de Cancún

Video Clips
 Don corazón
 Corazón de Piedra
 La Luna de Cancún
 Sólo una Mujer

References

1984 albums
Lucía Méndez albums